Annie A. M. Cuyt (born 1956) is a Belgian computational mathematician known for her work on continued fractions, numerical analysis, Padé approximants, and related topics. She is a professor at the University of Antwerp, and a member of the Royal Flemish Academy of Belgium for Science and the Arts.

Education and career
Cuyt was born on 27 May 1956 in Elizabethstad (now Lubumbashi), in the Belgian Congo. She earned her Ph.D. at the University of Antwerp in 1982. Her dissertation, Padé approximants for operators: theory and applications, was promoted by Luc Wuytack. She was a postdoctoral researcher with support from the Alexander von Humboldt Foundation, and completed a habilitation in 1986.

She is a professor in the Department of Mathematics and Computer Science at the University of Antwerp, where she leads the computational mathematics group.

Books
Cuyt is the author or coauthor of:
Padé Approximants for Operators: Theory and Applications (Lecture Notes in Mathematics 1065, Springer, 1984)
Nonlinear Methods in Numerical Analysis (with Luc Wuytack, North-Holland Mathematics Studies 136, North-Holland, 1987)
Handbook of Continued Fractions for Special Functions (with Vigdis Brevik Petersen, Brigitte Verdonk, Haakon Waadeland, and William B. Jones, Springer, 2008)

Recognition
Cuyt was elected to the Royal Flemish Academy of Belgium for Science and the Arts in 2013. The 4th Dolomites Workshop on Constructive Approximation and Applications, in 2016, and a special issue of the Dolomites Research Notes on Approximation, published in 2017, were dedicated to Cuyt in honor of her 60th birthday.

References

External links

1956 births
Living people
People from Lubumbashi
Belgian mathematicians
Belgian women mathematicians
University of Antwerp alumni
Academic staff of the University of Antwerp